Fanny Kassel (born 1984) is a French mathematician, specializing in the theory of Lie groups.

Career 
Kassel received her PhD under the direction of Yves Benoist at the University of Paris-Sud in 2009. Her thesis was on "Compact quotients of real or p-adic homogeneous spaces". She then entered the CNRS and worked at the Paul-Painlevé Laboratory of the University of Lille I until 2016, when she joined the IHÉS as detached CNRS researcher.

Honors and awards 
In 2015, she was awarded the CNRS Bronze Medal and an ERC starting grant the following year. In 2018, she was an invited speaker at the International Congress of Mathematicians at Rio de Janeiro; her lecture was on "Geometric structures and representations of discrete groups". She was named MSRI Chern Professor for Fall 2020.

References

External links 
Personal page on IHES website.

1984 births
Living people
French mathematicians
French women mathematicians
Group theorists
Lycée Louis-le-Grand alumni
École Normale Supérieure alumni